Sybil Leek (née Fawcett; 22 February 1917 – 26 October 1982) was an English witch, astrologer, occult author and self-proclaimed psychic. She wrote many books on occult and esoteric subjects, and was dubbed "Britain's most famous witch" by the BBC.

Personal life
Sybil Leek was born on 22 February 1917 in the village of Normacot in Stoke-on-Trent, Staffordshire, England to a comfortable, middle-class family. She claimed to have been descended from the historical Molly Leigh, who had been accused during the witch hunts. In her book The Complete Art of Witchcraft, pg 21, she calls this 800 year family beneficial relationship with 'our ancient Celtic form of Witchcraft' and occultism. At the age of 16 she married her music teacher, though he died two years later, whereupon Leek returned to live with her grandmother, quitting the Witchcraft research association. She later stayed with an acquaintance in Lyndhurst, in the New Forest, and claimed to have spent some of the following years living amongst the New Forest gypsies. When she was 20, Sybil returned to her family, who had now moved to the edge of the New Forest. She opened three antique shops; one in Ringwood, one in Somerset, and one in the New Forest village of Burley. She soon moved to Burley herself, into a house behind the shop Lawfords of Burley.

Her eccentric habits as a self-described witch soon resulted in problems. Media interest grew, and Sybil became tired of the attention from news reporters and tourists. Chris Packham, in a BBC article about her, quoted a contemporary saying, "people either thought she was a bit of a joke or a fraud." Although the village itself benefited from the extra tourism and visitors, some were unhappy with the extra traffic and noise. Her landlord eventually refused to renew her lease, prompting Leek to move away from the area and emigrate to the United States of America.

United States
When Leek moved to America, she became an astrologer, describing astrology as her "first love". In April 1964, an American publishing house wanted Sybil to speak about her new book A Shop in the High Street, and she was invited to appear on To Tell the Truth, a TV programme in the States; her appearance occurred on 13 April 1964. She took the opportunity to go, and flew to New York City, where she gave many interviews. While in New York, she was contacted by Hans Holzer, a parapsychologist, who invited her to join him investigating hauntings and psychic phenomena. They went on to do numerous TV and radio programmes on the subject. She would later move to Los Angeles, where she met Israel Regardie, an authority on Kabbalah and ritual magic.

Views
Strong in the defence of her beliefs, Leek sometimes differed and even quarrelled with other witches.  She disapproved of nudity in rituals, a requirement in some reconstructed traditions, and was strongly against the use of drugs, but she was at odds with most other witches in that she did believe in cursing. She also claimed to have had an out-of-body experience.

Her student Christine Jones stated that Leek "mixed truths with untruths liberally, causing great harm as she went."

Death
She died of cancer on 26 October 1982 at the Holmes Regional Medical Center in Melbourne, Florida.

Books
{| class="wikitable plainrowheaders sortable"
|+
|-
! scope="col" | Title
! scope="col" | Year
! scope="col" | Publisher
! scope="col" class="unsortable" | Identifier
|-
| A Shop in the High Street (1st UK edition)
| 1962
| Jarrolds
|-
| A Shop in the High Street (1st US edition)
| 1964
| David McKay Company
| 
|-
| Diary of a Witch
| 1968
| Prentice Hall
| 
|-
| The Sybil Leek Book of Fortune Telling
| 1969
| The Macmillan Company
|
|-
| Numerology: The Magic of Numbers
| 1969
| Macmillan
|
|-
| How To Be Your Own Astrologer
| 1970
| Cowles Book Company
|
|-
| The Sybil Leek's Astrological Guide to Successful Everyday Living
| 1970
| Prentice Hall
| 
|-
| Telepathy, The 'Respectable Phenomenon''' 
| 1971 
| The Macmillan Company - Book Club edition 
|
|-
| The Complete Art of Witchcraft| 1971
| a Signet Book New American Library
| 
|-
| The Astrological Guide to Financial Success| 1972
| Grosset & Dunlap
|
|-
| My Life in Astrology| 1972
| Prentice Hall Book club edition
|
|-
| The Story of Faith Healing| 1973
| Macmillan Publishing Company
|
|-
| Sybil Leek's Book of Herbs| 1973 
| Cornerstone Library, Simon & Schuster 
| 
|-
| Tomorrow's Headlines Today| 1974
| Prentice-Hall, Inc.
|-
| Reincarnation: the Second Chance| 1974
| Stein and Day
| 
|-
| Sybil Leek's Book of Curses| 1975 
| Prentice-Hall,Inc. Book Club Edition
|-
| Star Speak, Your Body Language from the Stars| 1975
| Arbor House
| 
|-
| Sybil Leek's Book of the Curious and Occult| 1976
| Ballantine Nonfiction
| 
|-
| Dreams| 1976
| W. H. Allen
|
|-
| Sybil Leek on Exorcism. Driving Out The Devils| 1976
| W. H. Allen
|
|-
| Astrology And Love. Be a Better Lover| 1977
| Berkley Publishing Corp. 
|
|-
| Moon Signs: Lunar Astrology| 1977
| W. H. Allen
| 
|}

Magazines

References

Sources
Bramshaw, Vikki. Craft of the Wise: A Practical Guide to Paganism & Witchcraft. .

 The Raveness. Molly, Sybil and Crowley a popular poem from her book Lavinia : Volume one. (2006) .
 Leek, Sybil, Diary of a Witch'' (Prentice-Hall, 1968).

External links
 Sybil Leek Memorial Page
 Lovestarz.com article on Sybil Leek
 BBC article on Sybil Leek
 controverscial.com article on Sybil Leek
 A Biographical Sketch of a Friend & Acquaintance of Aleister Crowley

1917 births
1982 deaths
English astrologers
20th-century astrologers
English occult writers
People from Longton, Staffordshire
English psychics
New Forest folklore